WASP or Wide Angle Search for Planets is an international consortium of several academic organisations performing an ultra-wide angle search for exoplanets using transit photometry. The array of robotic telescopes aims to survey the entire sky, simultaneously monitoring many thousands of stars at an apparent visual magnitude from about 7 to 13.

WASP is the detection program composed of the Isaac Newton Group, IAC and six universities from the United Kingdom. The two continuously operating, robotic observatories cover the Northern and Southern Hemisphere, respectively. SuperWASP-North is at Roque de los Muchachos Observatory on the mountain of that name which dominates La Palma in the Canary Islands. WASP-South is at the South African Astronomical Observatory, Sutherland in the arid Roggeveld Mountains of South Africa. These use eight wide-angle cameras that simultaneously monitor the sky for planetary transit events and allow the monitoring of millions of stars simultaneously, enabling the detection of rare transit events.

Instruments used for follow-up characterization employing doppler spectroscopy to determine the exoplanet's mass include the HARPS spectrograph of ESO's 3.6-metre telescope as well as the Swiss Euler Telescope, both located at La Silla Observatory, Chile. WASP's design has also been adopted by the Next-Generation Transit Survey. As of 2016, the Extrasolar Planets Encyclopaedia data base contains a total of 2,107 extrasolar planets of which 118 were discoveries by WASP.

Equipment 

WASP consists of two robotic observatories; SuperWASP-North at Roque de los Muchachos Observatory on the island of La Palma in the Canaries and WASP-South at the South African Astronomical Observatory, South Africa. Each observatory consists of an array of eight Canon 200 mm f1.8 lenses backed by high quality 2048 x 2048 science grade CCDs, the model used is the iKon-L manufactured by Andor Technology. The telescopes are mounted on an equatorial telescope mount built by Optical Mechanics, Inc. The large field of view of the Canon lenses gives each observatory a massive sky coverage of 490 square degrees per pointing.

Function 

The observatories continuously monitor the sky, taking a set of images approximately once per minute, gathering up to 100 gigabytes of data per night. By using the transit method, data collected from WASP can be used to measure the brightness of each star in each image, and small dips in brightness caused by large planets passing in front of their parent stars can be searched for.

One of the main purpose of WASP was to revolutionize the understanding of planet formation, paving the way for future space missions searching for 'Earth'-like worlds.

Structure 

WASP is operated by a consortium of academic institutions which include:
 Instituto de Astrofisica de Canarias
 Isaac Newton Group of Telescopes
 Keele University
 Open University
 Queen's University Belfast
 St. Andrews University
 University of Leicester
 Warwick University.

On 26 September 2006, the team reported the discovery of two extrasolar planets: WASP-1b (orbiting at 0.038 AU (6 million km) from star once every 2.5 days) and WASP-2b (orbiting three-quarters that radius once every 2 days).

On 31 October 2007, the team reported the discovery of three extrasolar planets: WASP-3b, WASP-4b and WASP-5b. All three planets are similar to Jovian mass and are so close to their respective stars that their orbital periods are all less than two days. These are among the shortest orbital periods discovered. The surface temperatures of the planets should be more than 2000 degrees Celsius, owing to their short distances from their respective stars. The WASP4b and WASP-5b are the first planets discovered by the cameras and researchers in South Africa. WASP-3b is the third planet discovered by the equivalent in La Palma.

In August 2009, the discovery of WASP-17b was announced, believed to be the first planet ever discovered to orbit in the opposite direction to the spin of its star, WASP-17.

Discoveries and follow-up observations 

 WASP-9b was determined to be a false positive after its initial public announcement as a planet, and the identifier has not been subsequently reassigned to a real planetary system.

1SWASP J140747.93-394542.6 b
The discovery of the J1407 system and its unusual eclipses were first reported by a team led by University of Rochester astronomer Eric Mamajek in 2012. The existence and parameters of the ring system around the substellar companion J1407b were deduced from the observation of a very long and complex eclipse of the previously anonymous star J1407 during a 56-day period during April and May 2007. The low-mass companion J1407b has been referred to as a "Saturn on steroids" or "Super Saturn" due to its massive system of circumplanetary rings with a radius of approximately 90 million km (0.6 AU). The orbital period of the ringed companion J1407b is estimated to be around a decade (constrained to 3.5 to 13.8 years), and its most probable mass is approximately 13 to 26 Jupiter masses, but with considerable uncertainty. The ringed body can be ruled out as being a star with mass of over 80 Jupiter masses at greater than 99% confidence. The ring system has an estimated mass similar to that of the Earth. A gap in the ring system at about 61 million km (0.4 AU) from its centre is considered to be indirect evidence of the existence of an exomoon with mass up to 0.8 Earth masses.

See also
 Lists of exoplanets
 Roque de los Muchachos Observatory
 South African Astronomical Observatory
 Science and Technology Facilities Council

Other extrasolar planet search projects
 Trans-Atlantic Exoplanet Survey or TrES
 XO Telescope or XO
 Kilodegree Extremely Little Telescope or KELT
 Next-Generation Transit Survey or NGTS
 HATNet Project or HAT

Extrasolar planet searching spacecraft

References

External links
 WASP Planets
 WASP primary website
 WASP-South live status 
 Public archive at the NASA Exoplanet Archive
 The Extrasolar Planets Encyclopaedia

News items
 QUB in April 2008
 Reaching for the stars in October 2007
 BBC News report: Planets have scientists buzzing in September 2006

Video clips
 Keele University
 

 
Exoplanet search projects by small telescope
Astronomical surveys
Robotic telescopes
Astronomical observatories in South Africa
Astronomical observatories in La Palma
Astronomy organizations